The El Yunque least gecko (Sphaerodactylus bromeliarum) is a species of lizard in the family Sphaerodactylidae. It is endemic to Cuba.

References

Sphaerodactylus
Reptiles of Cuba
Endemic fauna of Cuba
Reptiles described in 1977
Taxa named by Albert Schwartz (zoologist)